The Muff (German: Der Muff) is a 1919 German silent crime film directed by Joe May and Harry Piel and starring Hella Ingrid, Heinrich Schroth and Stefan Vacano. It is part of the series of films featuring popular detective Joe Deebs.

It was shot at the Tempelhof Studios in Berlin.

Cast
 Heinrich Schroth as Joe Deebs, Detektiv 
 Hella Ingrid
 Stefan Vacano

References

Bibliography
 Hans-Michael Bock & Michael Töteberg. Das Ufa-Buch. Zweitausendeins, 1992.

External links

1919 films
Films of the Weimar Republic
German silent feature films
Films directed by Harry Piel
Films directed by Joe May
UFA GmbH films
German black-and-white films
German crime films
1919 crime films
1910s German films